WRFC (960 kHz) is a commercial AM radio station in Athens, Georgia.  It airs a sports radio format, mostly using programming from ESPN Radio.  Owned by Cox Media Group, the television and radio subsidiary of Cox Enterprises, the station is sister to radio stations WNGC, WGAU, WGMG, WPUP, WXKT and the WSB family of stations in nearby Atlanta.  WRFC has studios in downtown Athens.  The transmitter is located off West Vincent Drive in the North Valley neighborhood, northwest of Athens.

Programming 
WRFC features local sports shows during weekday morning and afternoon drive time, as well as a Georgia Bulldogs hour at noon.  The rest of the schedule uses programming from ESPN Radio.  The station carries University of Georgia sports, as well as Atlanta Braves baseball games and Atlanta Falcons football games.

History
On May 1, 1948, WRFC first signed on the air.  It was originally owned by L. H. Christian, with the call sign chosen for his father, Robert Franklin Christian.  The station began as a 1,000-watt daytimer, required to go off the air at night.  The studios were at 279 North Lumpkin Street, in Athens.

WRFC later operated for many years at 5,000 watts non-directional daytime and 500 watts directional nighttime using a three tower array northeast of Athens, with studios in an impressive mansion in downtown Athens.  It featured 4 full service formats throughout its history, such as Top 40, middle of the road, and adult contemporary formats of popular music, news, and sports. 

On February 20, 1971, NORAD broadcast a normal required weekly test of the Emergency Broadcast System. However, AT&T reported that the U.S. Air Force used the wrong tape by accident, initiating an Emergency Action Notification, normally issued by the president. It prompted all north Georgia radio stations by order of the FCC to operate under emergency procedures and feed the broadcast from primary station 750 WSB in Atlanta through their transmitters. Everett Langford was at the microphone at WRFC and had no idea what had happened. He listened to WSB but heard no emergency announcements. He was attempting to call the owner, L.H. Christian, when he heard the corrected message from the Air Force.  Listeners could hear in his voice that he was very relieved it was only a mistake.

In 1981, WRFC dropped its Top 40 format and went into a short-lived MOR format. This didn't last long. WRFC dropped MOR and went into adult contemporary in 1982. When 1993 rolled along, the station began adding talk programs and sports programming from ESPN, although their adult contemporary format remains in place until the station dropped adult contemporary a year later in 1994. 

In January 2008, WRFC was sold (along with sister stations WGMG, WPUP, WNGC, and WGAU) to Cox Radio in Atlanta. Southern Broadcasting of Athens and associated owners continue as a wholly owned subsidiary of Cox.

Former on-air staff
 John Holliman (news, later with CNN) (deceased)
 Bill Hartman (sports and news)
 Johnny Jay (real name: Howard Toole)
 Larry Melear (1965–75) (was also chief engineer 1965–70 and 1971–75) (deceased)
 Jim Byard (1968 -1970)
 Tom Collins (1968 - 1971)
 Earl Pledger (1969–71)
 Everett Langford (1967–71) (was also chief engineer 1970–71)
 Ed Thilenius (sports)
 A.O. "Red" Healan
 Kate Murphy (Kathleen Emerson-Lambert)
 Jim Koger
 Morris "Night Owl" Knight
 Larry Johnson
 Charles Pinckney
 Craig Williams
Jim Powell
 Chris Jones (sports and news 1970-1974)
 Bob Burton (news)
 Phil Scoggins (sports and news)
 Garry Glenn (sports and news)
 Tony McVeigh (news)

References

External links

RFC
Cox Media Group
Radio stations established in 1948